The Bäumer B II "Sausewind" was a light sports tandem two-seat wooden cantilever monoplane. It was built by German aviation company Bäumer Aero GmbH, based at Hamburg Airport.

Specifications

References

Hallion, Richard P. "Airplanes that Transformed Aviation". Air & Space. 9 May 2008. Retrieved 12 February 2010.
"THE ROUND-GERMANY FLIGHT". Flight, 28 May 1925. pp. 317–326.

1920s German sport aircraft
Low-wing aircraft
Single-engined tractor aircraft
Aircraft first flown in 1925